Frederick William Harvey DCM (26 March 1888 – 13 February 1957), often known as Will Harvey, was an English poet, broadcaster and solicitor. His poetry became widely popular during and after World War I.

Early life
Harvey was born in 1888 in Hartpury, Gloucestershire, and grew up in Minsterworth. He was educated at the King's School, Gloucester, where he formed a close friendship with Ivor Gurney, and then at Rossall School. Gurney and Herbert Howells, another local composer, later set a number of his poems to music.

He started on a legal career, which would always be somewhat tentative; and began to consider conversion to Roman Catholicism.

World War I
On 8 August 1914, four days after the United Kingdom had declared war on Germany, Harvey joined the 5th Battalion, Gloucestershire Regiment as a private. Shortly afterwards, in November, he became a Roman Catholic. He was an adherent of the distributism movement, described as a "third way", in opposition to both socialism and capitalism; and he was influenced by the work of G. K. Chesterton and Hilaire Belloc.

His battalion was posted to France in March 1915, where he was promoted to lance corporal and awarded the Distinguished Conduct Medal. His citation for the DCM reads:

Harvey returned to England for officer training, but after being commissioned and returning to France he was captured on 17 August 1916 in the German front-line trench while carrying out a reconnaissance patrol. He spent the rest of the war in prisoner-of-war camps, including those at Gütersloh, Crefeld, Schwarmstedt, Holzminden, Bad Colberg, and Stralsund.

Writing
Soon after his arrival in France, Harvey began to contribute to a trench newspaper, the Fifth Gloucester Gazette. His first volume of poems, A Gloucestershire Lad at Home and Abroad, was published in September 1916, shortly after his capture. He began to write more intensively in captivity, and poems were sent back to England for publication: his second collection, Gloucestershire Friends, appeared in 1917. His time in the camps is held to be his most productive period of writing. On returning from a spell of solitary confinement at Holzminden after a failed escape attempt, he saw that a fellow prisoner had drawn a picture over his bed in chalk of ducks in a pool of water. This inspired his most celebrated poem (and the title poem of his third collection, published in 1919), "Ducks".

Post-war life
Harvey returned home in 1919, married in 1921, and returned to legal practice. He became a respected and loved figure in the Forest of Dean. He worked largely as a defence solicitor (his own captivity convincing him that incarceration was destructive and pointless), and became known as the "poor man's solicitor". His work was not financially successful, and in the 1930s he sold off his practice.

In 1920 he published a memoir of his prison-camp experiences, Comrades in Captivity; and in 1921 Farewell, an acknowledgement of his intention to remove himself from the literary world. He had a brief creative union with his great friend and collaborator, Ivor Gurney. Gurney had written "After-Glow" and "To His Love" for Harvey, on hearing of his supposed death in 1916; and "Ypres-Minsterworth" as a gesture of solidarity with him in his captivity. Their reunion was cut sadly short by Gurney's mental breakdown in 1922.

Harvey's gift for oration and his versatile voice and scripting led him to become a popular broadcaster at the BBC, Bristol, where he used his popularity to promote the Forest of Dean, its people and traditions. He furthered local choirs, musicians and young authors such as Leonard Clark. He was friends with Rutland Boughton and the local MP, Morgan Philips Price, who worked with him to promote the arts and the interests of Foresters.

Later years
In later life Harvey craved the comradeship he had found in the trenches and was saddened that the new social order he had expected never appeared. His later poetry of remembrance captured those feelings, but retained the essential humour of his early work and included verse in local dialect.

He died in 1957 and was buried at Minsterworth.

Personal life
In 1921 Harvey married Anne Kane, an Irish nurse. They had two children, Eileen Anne (born 1922) and Patrick (born 1925). He led a Bohemian lifestyle, rejecting material values, and often recklessly gave away his professional services and income.

Reputation and legacy

Harvey's poems published during and immediately after World War I were acclaimed, and his status was acknowledged when a collection was published in 1926 in the Augustan Books of Modern Poetry series, edited by Edward Thompson.

The lyricism of his poetry led to it being set to music by his friends Ivor Gurney, Herbert Howells and Sir Herbert Brewer, and others, including post-war composers such as Johnny Coppin. His work is noted particularly for its appreciation of the natural world and the landscape and traditions of West Gloucestershire.

Harvey was commemorated in 1980 by a slate memorial tablet in the south transept of Gloucester Cathedral. "Ducks", Harvey's best known verse, was voted one of the nation's 100 favourite poems in 1996 in a nationwide poll conducted by the BBC.

Works

Poetry collections

Edited collections

Novel

War memoirs

Notes

Bibliography

External links
 

20th-century English poets
1888 births
1957 deaths
Burials in Gloucestershire
Converts to Roman Catholicism
People from Hartpury
People educated at Rossall School
Gloucestershire Regiment soldiers
Gloucestershire Regiment officers
Recipients of the Distinguished Conduct Medal
British World War I prisoners of war
World War I prisoners of war held by Germany
English World War I poets
English solicitors
People educated at the King's School, Gloucester
English male poets
20th-century English male writers
People from Minsterworth
20th-century English lawyers
British Army personnel of World War I
Military personnel from Gloucestershire
Poètes maudits